The Enemy of My Enemy: The Alarming Convergence of Militant Islam and the Extreme Right is a 2006 book by political science professor George Michael of the University of Virginia Wise. It examines the alliances between neo-Nazis, Holocaust deniers, and white separatists with Islamists such as Al Qaeda, Hezbollah, Hamas, and Egyptian Islamic Jihad.

It was published in April 2006 by University Press of Kansas as a 397-page hardcover.

Synopsis
In the book George Michael of the University of Virginia Wise examines the positions of neo-Nazi and Islamist groups on American foreign policy, the media, modernity, and the so-called New World Order. Both camps share a "fervent anti-Semitism, accompanied by strong pro-Palestinian views, anger over Israel's influence on American policymakers, and opposition to the Iraq War and the U.S. presence in the Middle East."

Reception
Political Science Quarterly reviewed the book, writing:  George Michael's The Enemy of My Enemy explores the connections and possibilities for cooperation between a threat of substantial contemporary interest to policymakers, intelligence analysts, and political scientists—militant Islamic movements like the al Qaeda organization (AQO)--and one that is, in many respects, an incipient one, Western right-wing extremism. The book provides a good overview of the historical and intellectual wellsprings of these two movements, but ultimately does not provide a case that would justify alarm. 

Daveed Gartenstein-Ross of The Weekly Standard and Foundation for Defense of Democracies noted that the book contains extensive quotations with little analysis, but that its value "can be found in its in-depth study of the on-again, off-again love affair between radical Islam and the extreme right. How the latest chapter in this romance will play out remains to be seen."

References

Sources

External links
 The Enemy of My Enemy, at the publisher's website

2006 non-fiction books
American political books
Books about Islamism
Books about the far right
Non-fiction books about jihadism
Books about terrorism
Political science books
Books about antisemitism
Books about ISIS